Ambrose Barker (20 April 1859 – 14 February 1953) was a British anarchist activist.

Born in Earls Barton, Northamptonshire, Barker moved to Leyton in London in 1878 to become an assistant schoolmaster and joined the National Secular Society.  In 1880, he openly opposed Charles Bradlaugh's support for the Coercion Bill.  Bradlaugh was a leading figure in the Secular Society.  Barker gained the support of the majority of the Stratford branch of the Secular Society, but failed to influence its national politics.

The Stratford group disaffiliated from the National Society to form the "Stratford Dialectical and Radical Club".  This group professed socialism, and Barker became their secretary. Joseph Lane showed Barker newspapers produced by American anarchist Benjamin Tucker, and Barker took up a correspondence with Tucker.

Barker and Lane set up a new group, the Labour Emancipation League, which in 1884 merged with H. M. Hyndman's organisation to form the Social Democratic Federation.  The majority of the group soon split to form the Socialist League, and Barker followed Lane into the new organisation.  By this time, Lane was an active anarchist, and sided with the anti-Parliamentary faction in the group.  He appears to have left around the same time as Lane, at the end of the decade, and by 1895 was active in the Anarchist Communist Alliance, an organization whose manifesto was written by Max Nettlau.

In 1892, Barker became the secretary of Walthamstow Workingmen's Club, a post he held until 1950.  Continuing in anarchist activism, in 1930, he was a founder member of the London Freedom Group.  He appears to have become active in the National Secular Society again, and his partner Ella Twynam wrote several pieces for them.

References

The Slow Burning Fuse - The Labour Emancipation League (Archived 2009-10-25)
Lives Remembered: Ambrose Barker and Ella Twynan by Albert Meltzer

1859 births
1953 deaths
English anarchists
Social Democratic Federation members
Socialist League (UK, 1885) members
People from Earls Barton